Wauters is a Dutch-language patronymic surname most common in Flanders and may refer to:

Alphonse Wauters (1817–1898), Belgian archivist and historian
Ann Wauters (born 1980), Belgian basketball player
 (1890–1960), Belgian government minister
Camille Wauters (1856–1919), Belgian painter
Charles Augustin Wauters (1808–1869), Belgian painter
Eddy Wauters (born 1933), Belgian footballer, banker, and chairman of football club Antwerp
Emile Wauters (1846–1933), Belgian painter
Koen Wauters (born 1967), Belgian TV presenter and singer in Clouseau
Kris Wauters (born 1964), Belgian TV presenter and musician in Clouseau
 (1875–1929), Belgian government minister
 (1906–1975), Belgian cyclist
Marc Wauters (born 1969), Belgian cyclist
 (c. 1620 – c. 1680), Flemish Baroque painter
Nick Wauters (born 1969), Belgian  television writer and editor

See also
Wouters, homonymic surname

Dutch-language surnames
Surnames of Belgian origin
Patronymic surnames